The 1979 Hardie-Ferodo 1000 was the 20th running of the Bathurst 1000 touring car race. It was held on 30 September 1979, at the Mount Panorama Circuit just outside Bathurst. The race was open to cars eligible to the locally developed CAMS Group C touring car regulations with four engine capacity based classes.

Peter Brock and Jim Richards won their second successive Bathurst 1000 driving a Holden Dealer Team A9X SS Hatchback Torana. Brock and Richards won the race by a record six laps, beating the old winning margin of 2 laps set in 1975 with Brock setting the lap record of 2:21.1 on the last lap of the 6.172 km long circuit. It was Brock's fourth and Richards second win. Brock's win put him equal on most wins with Harry Firth, Bob Jane and his longtime rival Allan Moffat. Toranas swept the podium with Peter Janson and Larry Perkins finishing second ahead of Ralph Radburn and John Smith.

With Holden ending production of the Torana, 1979 would be the 5th and last Torana victory in the race (all bar 1976 were won by Brock). From 1980 Holden's flagship would be the European (Opel Senator) based Commodore.

Class structure
Cars competed in four classes defined by engine capacity.

3001cc - 6000cc

The 3001cc - 6000cc class featured the V8 Holden Toranas, Ford Falcons and a pair of Chevrolet Camaros, making their Bathurst debut. Class A cars would fill the first eight positions in the outright results, all of the Holden Toranas. Mirroring the outright result, Brock and Richards took a six lap victory over the similar Torana of Janson and Perkins. Smith and Radburn were two laps further behind.

2001cc - 3000cc
The 2001cc - 3000cc class saw the debut of the Mazda RX-7 (13B powered rotaries were rated as 2.292 litres capacity) which raced alongside its predecessor, the Mazda RX-3 and against Ford Capris, a BMW 3.0Si and a largely unmodified Volvo 242GT entered as a publicity exercise by veteran journalist-racer David McKay. Mechanical issues struck this class more than most, with the class winning car finishing in 13th outright, 26 laps behind Brock and Richards. That car was the Mazda RX-3 of Barry Lee and John Gates. Second in class was the Ford Capri of Peter Hopwood and Alan Cant, nine laps behind Lee and Gates. Third in class, finishing on the same lap as Hopwood/Cant was the Mazda RX-3 of Stephen Stockdale and John Duggan. The Volvo of McKay and Spencer Martin finished a creditable fourth in class, just a lap behind second and third.

1601cc - 2000cc

The 1601cc - 2000cc class saw a mix Alfa Romeo Alfettas, Ford Escort RS2000s, Toyota Celicas and Triumph Dolomites. Class C outperformed Class B with the Toyota Dealer Team Toyota Celica of Peter Williamson and Mike Quinn winning the class and finishing ninth outright and 17 laps behind Brock and Richards. The Brian Foley Alfa Romeo entered Alfa Romeo Alfetta GTV of Phil McDonnell and British sportscar legend Derek Bell finished tenth outright, a lap behind the Celica. Frank Porter and Tony Niovanni were three laps further back in third in another Alfetta.
The Celica of Peter Williamson was the first in the world to have an in car race cam.

Up to 1600cc
The entry in the Up to 1600cc class was dominated by Holden Geminis, but also included an Isuzu Gemini, a 1.6 litre Ford Escort, a Toyota Corolla, and a Volkswagen Golf. The Isuzu Gemini of Garry Leggatt and David Seldon won the class, finishing 21st outright, 36 laps down. Bernie McClure and David Langman's Holden Gemini was second, a lap behind the class winners with the Holden Gemini of Jim Faneco and Gary Rowe two laps further behind. Eight laps behind was the first non-Gemini, the Ford Escort of Bob Holden and David Earle.

Hardies Heroes

* Allan Moffat only qualified 22nd in his Falcon after engine troubles in qualifying. He was moved into Hardies Heroes by the ARDC at the expense of the HDT Torana SS A9X of John Harvey and ended up starting from 4th on the grid. Apart from race broadcaster Channel 7 wanting Moffat in the runoff for better television ratings, Harvey was bumped to 11th place on the grid due to the ARDC's desire to not have two cars from the same team in the top 10. As the #05 HDT Torana of Peter Brock was the fastest qualifier this saw Harvey the one left out.* After Jack Brabham and Derek Bell in 1978, Larry Perkins became the third ex-Formula One driver to appear in the shootout driving Peter Janson's Torana. While neither Brabham or Bell would again appear in the runoff, Perkins would make another 16 appearances up until 2002 and would claim pole in 1993 (he also sat on pole in 1983 but that time was set by Peter Brock)* Peter Brock claimed his 4th straight front row start at Bathurst (and his 5th in 6 years after starting 3rd in 1975) as well as his 3rd straight pole position. Brock's time was 1.966s faster than Bob Morris' 2nd place time in his ATCC winning A9X Torana. This was despite Brock admitting to making a big mistake at the Cutting on his second lap where his foot slipped off the brake pedal and the car went wide towards the wall forcing him to come to almost a complete stop at the bottom of the steepest part of the circuit.

Results

References

Statistics
 Provisional Pole Position - #05 Peter Brock - 2:26.8
 Pole Position - #05 Peter Brock - 2:20.500
 Fastest Lap - #05 Peter Brock - 2:21.1 - Lap 163 (lap record)
 Average Speed - 152 km/h
 Race Time - 6:38:15.8

External links
 CAMS Manual reference to Australian titles
 www.touringcarracing.net
 race results
 Autopics Bathurst images

Motorsport in Bathurst, New South Wales
Hardie-Ferodo 1000